Susana Werner (born 20 July 1977) is a Brazilian model and actress. Werner's parents are Kátia and Avelino Werner. She has a brother named André. Her family is of Germany descent.

Personal life
From 1997 to 1999, Susana Werner had a relationship with Brazilian footballer Ronaldo. Later, she married the Brazilian goalkeeper Júlio César. The couple has two children, Cauet (born in 2002) and Giulia (born in 2005).

In June 2013, Werner was robbed at gunpoint after her car was stopped as she drove through Fortaleza late at night.

Filmography

Film

Television

References

External links

1977 births
Living people
Actresses from Rio de Janeiro (city)
Brazilian people of German descent
Brazilian female models
Association footballers' wives and girlfriends
Brazilian television actresses
Brazilian film actresses
Brazilian emigrants to Italy
Brazilian emigrants to Portugal
Brazilian models of German descent